Discovery is an American indie electronic recording project of Rostam Batmanglij and Wesley Miles, friends who began recording together in the summer of 2005.

History
Before Batmanglij and Miles found success in the indie rock scene with Vampire Weekend and Ra Ra Riot, respectively, they recorded as the synth-pop duo Discovery in 2005. Their music drew from the sounds of synth-pop and auto-tuned R&B. As Discovery, Batmanglij and Miles began recording an album together in 2006, but the project was left unfinished as Vampire Weekend and Ra Ra Riot began to find chart success. After the release of the debut albums for both Vampire Weekend and Ra Ra Riot, Batmanglij and Miles returned to the studio to complete Discovery's debut album, LP, released in 2009.

Members
Rostam Batmanglij
Wes Miles

Discography

 LP (July 7, 2009)

References

External links

Indie rock musical groups from New York (state)
XL Recordings artists
Musical groups established in 2005
Electronic music groups from New York (state)
Rock music duos